Pasi Martti Sormunen (born March 8, 1970 in Kauniainen, Finland) is a retired professional ice hockey player who played in the SM-liiga.

Playing career
He played for HIFK, Jokerit, and Espoo Blues.  He also won a bronze medal at the 1994 Winter Olympics.

Career statistics

Regular season and playoffs

International

External links 

1970 births
Living people
ECH Chur players
Espoo Blues players
Finnish ice hockey defencemen
Frölunda HC players
HIFK (ice hockey) players
Ice hockey players at the 1994 Winter Olympics
Jokerit players
Medalists at the 1994 Winter Olympics
Nürnberg Ice Tigers players
Olympic ice hockey players of Finland
Olympic medalists in ice hockey
People from Kauniainen
Sportspeople from Uusimaa